The Night of Tricks (Italian: La notte delle beffe) is a 1939 Italian "white-telephones" comedy film directed by Carlo Campogalliani and starring Amedeo Nazzari, Dria Paola and Maurizio D'Ancora.

It was shot at Cinecittà Studios in Rome. The film's sets were designed by the art director Nino Maccarones.

Cast
 Amedeo Nazzari as Capatosta 
 Dria Paola as Giulietta 
 Maurizio D'Ancora as Filippo 
 Elli Parvo as Maria, la figlia dell'oste 
 Olga Capri as Assunta 
 Ernesto Almirante as Francesco Acquaviva 
 Achille Majeroni as Righetti 
 Giovanni Petti as Gennaro, l'oste 
 Andrea Checchi as Giorgio Albini 
 Arnaldo Arnaldi as Pallotta 
 Giuseppe Pierozzi as Pietro 
 Oscar Andriani as Un falso brigante 
 Lia Orlandini as Ersilia 
 Alberto Sordi as Bentivoglio 
 Mario Lodolini as Uno studente

References

Bibliography 
 Moliterno, Gino. Historical Dictionary of Italian Cinema. Scarecrow Press, 2008.

External links 
 

1939 films
Italian comedy films
Italian black-and-white films
1939 comedy films
1930s Italian-language films
Films directed by Carlo Campogalliani
Films shot at Cinecittà Studios
1930s Italian films